Patella lugubris is a species of sea snail, a true limpet, a marine gastropod mollusk in the family Patellidae, one of the families of true limpets.

Description
The length of the shell attains 50.4 mm.

Distribution
This species occurs in the Atlantic Ocean off Cape Verde and the Azores.

References

 Nakano T. & Ozawa T. (2007). Worldwide phylogeography of limpets of the order Patellogastropoda: molecular, morphological and paleontological evidence. Journal of Molluscan Studies 73(1): 79–99.
Notes on the nomenclature of the Macaronesian Patella candei d'Orbigny complex, with special reference to Patella ordinaria Mabille and Patella crenata Gmelin (Patellogastropoda, Patellidae). Basteria 83(4-6): 158-165

External links
  Gmelin, J.F. (1791) Vermes. In Gmelin J.F. (Ed.) Caroli a Linnaei Systema Naturae per Regna Tria Naturae, Editio Decima Tertia, Aucta Reformata. Tome 1, Pars 6 (Vermes). G.E. Beer, Lipsiae [Leipzig], pp. 3021–3910
 Locard, A. (1897-1898). Expéditions scientifiques du Travailleur et du Talisman pendant les années 1880, 1881, 1882 et 1883. Mollusques testacés. Paris, Masson. vol. 1 
  Koufopanou, V., Reid, D.G., Ridgeway, S.A., & Thomas, R.H. (1999). A molecular phylogeny of the patellid limpets (Gastropoda: Patellidae) and its implications for the origins of their antitropical distribution. Molecular Phylogenetics and Evolution. 11(1): 138-156.

Patellidae
Gastropods of Cape Verde
Gastropods described in 1791
Taxa named by Johann Friedrich Gmelin